Pontibacter chinhatensis  is a Gram-negative, halotolerant and rod-shaped bacterium from the genus of Pontibacter which has been isolated from sediments from a pond near a hexachlorocyclohexane dumpsite in Lucknow in India.

References 

Cytophagia
Bacteria described in 2015